Big Brother Naija Season 6 also known as Big Brother Naija: Shine Ya Eye was the sixth season of the Nigerian version of the reality show Big Brother. It premiered on 24 and 25 July 2021 on DStv channel 198 and GOtv channel 29. Ebuka Obi-Uchendu returned as host for the 5th consecutive season.

The headline sponsor of the show was Abeg and the associate sponsor was Patricia. Other sponsors included travelbeta, Darling hair, WAW and a host of many others.

According to the organizers of the show MultiChoice, the winner of the season six is expected to win a total of ₦90 million grand prize which includes a ₦30 million cash prize, cash in an Abeg digital wallet, bitcoins courtesy of Patricia, a two-bedroom apartment courtesy of RevolutionPlus Property, a top of the range SUV from a Nigerian automaker, Innoson Motors and a trip for two packaged by Travelbeta.

Auditions
Due to the COVID-19 pandemic, a virtual audition was held to select contestants for the show from 3 May 2021 to 16 May 2021. Interested contestants were told to record and submit a two-minute video stating why they should appear on the show.

Housemates 

The 1st launch night (24 July) is marked as Day 0A. The 2nd launch night (25 July) is marked as Day 0B. The day after is Day 1.

Voting history & nominations table 

Full voting percentages were revealed on the official site on 8 October, 2021.

Notes

 : During the 2nd launch night on the 25th of July, 2021, Big Brother announced that there were 2 fake housemates, called wildcards, that were revealed at the end of Week 1's Sunday show. The two wildcards were revealed to be Maria and Pere that day. Since the housemates guessed incorrectly, no one got evicted on that day.
 : For going undetected, the wildcards; Maria and Pere were given the opportunity to nominate the other housemates outside the Head of House for eviction.
 : On Day 14, Big Brother introduced 4 new housemates to the Big Brother house: JMK, Michael, Kayvee and Queen.
: Kayvee exited the Big Brother house on Day 22 voluntarily due to health-related issues.
: Big Brother informed Maria that as Head of House, there will be no nominations or eviction in week 4. She was however given a secret task to make the housemates believe that the two housemates who impress her the least will be evicted on Sunday.
: For the week's Head of House games, Big Brother announced that there will be 2 Heads of House.
: On the same day, it was also announced that all housemates apart from the 2 Heads of House would be up for public voting.
: Big Brother introduced a nomination twist as nominations were done before the Head of House games and the housemates had the opportunity of saving themselves from the nomination list.
:The nomination twist used in week 7 was reapplied in week 8.
: In week 9, Big Brother decided to scrap the Head of House games, replacing them with the Ultimate Veto Power Holder Games. The Ultimate Veto Power Holder not only had the power of immunity from public voting, but they could pick both the Head and Deputy Head of House.
: Also, in the same week, everyone except the Ultimate Veto Power Holder, Head of House and Deputy Head of House were up for public voting.
: Due to an eviction twist on day 63, while Pere and Angel left the house, they have not left the show. A day later, both housemates returned to the house.

References 

Nigeria
2021 Nigerian television seasons